Contemporary British History is a quarterly peer reviewed academic journal covering the history of Britain since 1945. It was established in 1987 as the Contemporary Record, obtaining its current name in 1996. It is published by Routledge and the editors-in-chief are Tony Shaw (University of Hertfordshire), Christopher Moores (University of Birmingham), Lucy Robinson (University of Sussex), and Camilla Schofield (University of East Anglia).

History 
The journal was established in 1987 as the journal of the Institute of Contemporary British History. which had been founded two years prior by Anthony Seldon and Peter Hennessy. Seldon co-founded and co-edited the journal from 1987 to 1995. Its original format was a "combination of academic journal and news magazine that analyze[d] British history and current affairs". Among its sections were "Mediawatch", and "Private Papers", the latter of which surveyed deposited private documents relevant to modern British history.

Abstracting and indexing
The journal is abstracted and indexed in:
Arts and Humanities Citation Index
British Humanities Index
EBSCO databases
International Bibliography of the Social Sciences
ProQuest databases
Scopus

References

External links

Routledge academic journals
British history journals
Publications established in 1987
English-language journals
Quarterly_journals